Super Bowl XLVIII was an American football game between the American Football Conference (AFC) champion Denver Broncos and National Football Conference (NFC) champion Seattle Seahawks to decide the National Football League (NFL) champion for the 2013 season. The Seahawks defeated the Broncos 43–8, the largest margin of victory for an underdog and tied for the third largest point differential overall (35) in Super Bowl history with Super Bowl XXVII (1993). It was the first time the winning team scored over 40 points while holding their opponent to under 10. This became the first Super Bowl victory for the Seahawks and the fifth Super Bowl loss for the Broncos, at the time a league record (it would later be tied by the New England Patriots following their Super Bowl LII loss) for the most of any team. The game was played on February 2, 2014, at MetLife Stadium at the Meadowlands Sports Complex in East Rutherford, New Jersey, the first Super Bowl played outdoors in a cold-weather city and the first Super Bowl to be played on February 2.

The Seahawks posted a 13–3 record and were making their second Super Bowl appearance in nine years. The Broncos were making their seventh Super Bowl appearance after also posting a 13–3 record. This marked one of the few times that two former divisional rivals met in a Super Bowl, as the Seahawks and Broncos were in the same division (the AFC West) from 1977 to 2001.

Seattle led 22–0 at halftime and ultimately went up 36–0 before allowing Denver's first and only score on the final play of the third quarter. The 36–0 lead was by far the largest shutout lead in Super Bowl history; the previous record was 24–0, shared by the Miami Dolphins over the Minnesota Vikings in Super Bowl VIII and the Washington Redskins over the Buffalo Bills in Super Bowl XXVI. Seahawks defensive end Cliff Avril scored a safety on the first play from scrimmage. They became the first team in a Super Bowl to score on a safety (12 seconds into the start of the game which set the record for the quickest score), a kickoff return for a touchdown (12 seconds into the second half), and an interception return for a touchdown. The Broncos were held to almost 30 points below their scoring average. Broncos quarterback Peyton Manning, a five-time NFL Most Valuable Player (MVP) award winner, threw two interceptions in the first half. Seahawks linebacker Malcolm Smith, who returned one of those interceptions 69 yards for a touchdown, recovered a fumble and made nine tackles, was named Super Bowl MVP.

In the United States, the game was televised by Fox; with an average audience of 111.5 million viewers that peaked at 115.3 million during the halftime show featuring Bruno Mars, the game was briefly the most-watched U.S. television broadcast of all time, until it was surpassed by Super Bowl XLIX the following year. The game's inaugural Spanish-language telecast on Fox Deportes was also the highest-rated Spanish-language cable telecast outside of soccer. Seattle also tied the 1992 Dallas Cowboys for the third-largest blowout in Super Bowl history, behind Super Bowl XXIV in 1990, a 55–10 San Francisco 49ers victory over the Denver Broncos, and Super Bowl XX in 1986, a 46–10 Chicago Bears victory over the New England Patriots. This was also the first time since 1991 that the #1 scoring offense (Broncos) went up against the #1 scoring defense (Seahawks).

Background

Previous plans for a Super Bowl in the New York City area
Efforts to see the New York City area host a Super Bowl predate MetLife Stadium's planning.

 
In the aftermath of the 9/11 terrorist attacks in New York City and Washington, D.C., those metro areas' business communities separately discussed seeking to host a future Super Bowl. The general thought was that either of these cities being the location of a Super Bowl would symbolize national recovery in the aftermath of the attacks. There was belief that if New York were awarded a Super Bowl (either building a new stadium or renovated the existing Giants Stadium to be the host venue), it might assist the city's bid for the 2012 Summer Olympics in the same vein that awarding Super Bowl XXVIII to the city of Atlanta may have assisted the prospects of Atlanta's ultimately successful bid for the 1996 Summer Olympics.

Both New York City and Washington, D.C. were, at one point, seen as likely to bid in 2003 for either 2008's Super Bowl XLII or 2009's Super Bowl XLIII. However, the prospect of the New York City region hosting a Super Bowl proved challenging due not only to the non-ideal cold weather climate, but also due to the difficulty in delivering an appropriate host venue. The city of New York and the New York Jets failed to secure a deal to build a new West Side Stadium (which, according to the initial plans, would have been built with a roof). Proposed renovations to the aging Giants Stadium were still subject to dispute between stakeholders. Giants Stadium lacked a roof, as did the city's two Major League Baseball stadiums. The lack of a venue with a roof was also seen as an obstacle due to the NFL having never played an outdoor Super Bowl in a cold weather climate.

New York City ultimately bid in 2005 for a Super Bowl. The NFL voted on March 23, 2005 to award New York City the rights to host 2010's Super Bowl XLIV, contingent on the proposed West Side Stadium (the planned site of the game) being completed by 2008. In August 2005, after New York state government officials declined to approve $400 million for the stadium, the NFL decided to revoke New York City's hosting rights, and reopen the bidding for the game's site.

Host selection process

Three stadiums were part of the bidding to host the game:

 MetLife Stadium – East Rutherford, New Jersey
 Raymond James Stadium – Tampa, Florida
 Sun Life Stadium – Miami Gardens, Florida

Tampa had hosted four Super Bowls (XVIII, XXV, XXXV and XLIII), while South Florida / Miami had hosted ten Super Bowls (II, III, V, X, XIII, XXIII, XXIX, XXXIII, XLI and XLIV).

During the voting process by the league owners, the South Florida/Miami bid was eliminated in the second round of voting, but it eventually took the fourth round of voting for New Jersey's bid to beat Tampa's. The game was awarded on May 26, 2010 at the NFL owners meetings in Irving, Texas.

Super Bowl XLVIII was the first Super Bowl held at an open-air stadium in a "cold-weather" city; previous Super Bowls in cold-weather cities were held at indoor stadiums. However, the temperature at kickoff was a mild , making this only the third-coldest Super Bowl. A major snow storm hit the area the very next day. Since Super Bowl X in 1976, all but one outdoor Super Bowl has been played in either California or Florida, the exception being Super Bowl XXX in Tempe, Arizona. NFL Commissioner Roger Goodell indicated that if Super Bowl XLVIII was successful, additional "cold-weather" Super Bowls would be considered.

Super Bowl XLVIII was the first NFL championship game to be held in the New York metropolitan area since December 30, 1962, when the Green Bay Packers beat the New York Giants in the original Yankee Stadium, 16–7. Since then, two other major pro football leagues have held title games in the area:
 1968 AFL Championship Game at Shea Stadium, December 29, 1968: New York Jets 27, Oakland Raiders 23. The Jets went on to Super Bowl III, where they upset the Baltimore Colts, 16–7.
 1985 USFL Championship Game at Giants Stadium, July 14, 1985: Baltimore Stars 28, Oakland Invaders 24. This game turned out to be the final contest in the league's three-year history.

MetLife Stadium was the first Super Bowl venue that was simultaneously home to two NFL teams: the New York Giants and the New York Jets, and thus was the first championship game to have two host teams. The Los Angeles Memorial Coliseum (which hosted Super Bowls I and VII) served as the home of the Los Angeles Rams and the Los Angeles Raiders, but not at the same time.

This was also the first Super Bowl played outdoors on artificial turf (FieldTurf) since Super Bowl X (1976) at the Miami Orange Bowl. It was also the first in which two U.S. states, New York and New Jersey, shared hosting duties. This was also the first Super Bowl to be played outdoors since Super Bowl XLIV was played in Miami Gardens.

Winter outlook and contingency plans
The choice of holding the Super Bowl outdoors in a cold weather environment generated some controversy. When it was released in August 2013, the "Winter Outlook" section in the 2014 Farmers' Almanac predicted that a winter storm would hit just about the time Super Bowl XLVIII kicked off; this generated the attention of several media sources, including ESPN's Rick Reilly in a piece that aired on ESPN's Monday Night Countdown on October 21, 2013. In a radio interview broadcast on WFAN, Fox studio analyst Terry Bradshaw stated that he opposes the idea of a cold Super Bowl, stating "I don't want it to be bad ... What if we get two passing teams?" In a piece published on Sports Illustrated'''s "Monday Morning Quarterback" site, Seattle Seahawks cornerback Richard Sherman also opposed holding the game at MetLife Stadium, stating that "it's the league's responsibility to show its audience the best possible product, and this can't happen in the snow." The decision to play the game in New Jersey was made even more controversial by the fact that the NFL informed the Miami Dolphins that Sun Life Stadium would never host another Super Bowl until they put a roof over the stadium for fear of rain.

The NFL announced on December 18, 2013, that in the event of a forecast of heavy snow, the game would be rescheduled for the Saturday before, or for the Monday or Tuesday after.

One day before the Super Bowl, weather conditions for the game were forecast to be mostly cloudy with temperatures in the low to mid-40s Fahrenheit.

A winter storm arrived 6 hours after the game ended, dropping  of snow on the region. The inclement weather canceled a quarter of the flights available at the area's three major airports, stranding thousands.

Nicknames
Super Bowl XLVIII earned a few unofficial nicknames, with the "Weed Bowl," "Bong Bowl," and "Marijuana Bowl" being among the most prominent, from users of social networking websites and various news outlets as the home states of the Seahawks and Broncos (Washington and Colorado, respectively) were the first two states to legalize marijuana for recreational use, during the fall 2012 elections.

Teams

The Broncos and Seahawks were divisional AFC West rivals from  1977 until 2001, when the Seahawks moved to the NFC West. Their matchup in Super Bowl XLVIII marked the first time former in-division rivals met in the Super Bowl since Super Bowl XLIII.

Seattle Seahawks

Seattle finished the season 13–3, winning the NFC West division and home-field advantage throughout the playoffs. The team scored 417 points during the season, while giving up 231.

The offense was led by second-year quarterback Russell Wilson, a third-round draft pick who won the starting role after a three-way quarterback competition in training camp and went on to win a playoff game in his rookie season with the Seahawks. In his second season, he completed 63.1 percent of his passes for 3,357 yards and 26 touchdowns, with only nine interceptions, while also rushing for 539 yards and another score. His 101.2 passer rating ranked him seventh in the NFL, and made him the first quarterback in history with a triple-digit passer rating in his first two seasons. His top target was Pro Bowl receiver Golden Tate, who caught 64 passes for 898 yards and five touchdowns. Tate was also a major asset on special teams, returning 51 punts for 585 yards (second in the NFL). Other key targets included Doug Baldwin (50 receptions, 775 yards, five touchdowns) and tight end Zach Miller (33 receptions, 387 yards, five touchdowns). Pro Bowl running back Marshawn Lynch was the team's leading rusher with 1,257 yards and 12 touchdowns. He was also a reliable receiver, hauling in 36 passes for 316 yards and two more scores. The Seahawks' offensive line was led by Pro Bowl center Max Unger. Kicker Steven Hauschka ranked fourth in the NFL in scoring (143 points) and second in field goal percentage (.943, 33/35).

Seattle had the NFL's top defense, with the fewest yards allowed per game (273.6), fewest points allowed (231) and most takeaways (39). They were the first team since the 1985 Chicago Bears to lead the league in all three categories. The Seahawks were also the fourth team to lead the NFL in interceptions and fewest passing yards allowed; all four teams reached the Super Bowl. Seattle's defensive line featured defensive ends Cliff Avril and Michael Bennett, both of whom recorded eight sacks. Avril also forced five fumbles, while Bennett recovered three, returning them for 39 yards and a touchdown. Defensive tackle Clinton McDonald also made a big impact with 5.5 sacks, two fumble recoveries and an interception. Linebacker Bobby Wagner led the team in combined tackles (120), while also racking up five sacks and two interceptions. But the best aspect of the defense was their secondary – collectively known as the Legion of Boom – which sent three of their four starters to the Pro Bowl: cornerback Richard Sherman, who led the NFL in interceptions (eight, with 125 return yards), along with free safety Earl Thomas (five interceptions, 105 tackles, two forced fumbles) and strong safety Kam Chancellor (99 tackles, three interceptions, 78 return yards).

Denver Broncos

Denver finished the season 13–3 for the second straight year, winning the AFC West division and home-field advantage throughout the playoffs. The Broncos had the best offense in the NFL, leading the league in points scored (606, the highest total in NFL history) and yards gained (7,313). The offense was so explosive that they scored points on their opening possession at least eight straight games leading into the playoffs and a ninth time against the San Diego Chargers during the Divisional Playoffs game. During the AFC Championship Game against the New England Patriots, they broke that streak, only to score on the opening possession of the second half. In only five out of 18 games (including playoffs) did they score fewer than 30 points, the fewest being 20 points.

In command of the offense was 16-year veteran quarterback Peyton Manning. Now in his second year as the team's starter, Manning posted one of the best seasons of any quarterback in NFL history (and the best season of his entire career), leading the league in completions, attempts, yards and touchdown passes. His 5,477 passing yards and 55 touchdown completions both set new NFL records. His total of 450 completions was the second-highest in NFL history, and his 115.1 passer rating ranked second in the league that season. Denver's leading pass-catcher was Pro Bowl receiver Demaryius Thomas, who caught 92 passes for 1,430 yards and 14 touchdowns, but Manning had plenty of other reliable options, including Eric Decker (97 receptions, 1,288 yards, 11 touchdowns), Wes Welker (73 receptions, 778 yards, 10 touchdowns) and Pro Bowl tight end Julius Thomas (65 receptions, 788 yards, 12 touchdowns). Overall, they made Denver the first team in NFL history ever to have four players with at least 10 touchdown receptions in a season. Running back Knowshon Moreno was the team's leading rusher with 1,038 yards and 10 touchdowns, while also catching 60 passes for 548 yards and another three scores. Rookie running back Montee Ball was also a big contributor with 554 rushing yards, four touchdowns and 20 receptions. The team's offensive line featured Pro Bowl guard Louis Vasquez. On special teams, Pro Bowl kicker Matt Prater ranked second in the NFL in scoring (150 points) and first in field goal percentage (.962, 25/26). His only miss of the year was from 52 yards and his successful attempt from 64 yards against Tennessee in Week 14 broke an NFL record that had stood for 44 years.

Defensive end Shaun Phillips anchored the Broncos' line with 10 sacks, while linebacker Danny Trevathan racked up 129 combined tackles, three forced fumbles and three interceptions. Defensive end Malik Jackson was also a key component of the defense with 42 tackles and six sacks, helping compensate for the loss of Von Miller, who had five sacks in nine games before suffering a season-ending injury. Cornerbacks Dominique Rodgers-Cromartie and Chris Harris Jr. led the secondary with three interceptions each.

Playoffs

Both the Seahawks and Broncos entered the postseason as the number one seed in their respective conferences, which meant they received byes through the first round of the playoffs.

The Seahawks' first playoff game was in the NFC divisional round, a rematch of Monday Night Football from Week 13, playing the New Orleans Saints at home. The Seahawks had a 16-point lead at halftime, but although the Saints were able to halve the deficit in the fourth quarter, they could not close the gap further before a botched play in the final seconds ended the game, with the Seahawks winning 23–15.

The Seahawks then played in the NFC Championship Game at home against the rival San Francisco 49ers; the two teams had each won once against the other during the regular season. Despite entering halftime with a seven-point deficit, the Seahawks took the lead in the fourth quarter thanks largely to Colin Kaepernick losing one fumble and throwing two interceptions. The second interception came in the final seconds of the game when Richard Sherman batted the ball into the arms of Malcolm Smith to seal the 23–17 win and send the Seahawks to their second Super Bowl in franchise history.

The Broncos faced the San Diego Chargers in the AFC divisional round. Although their record-breaking offense was held to an unusually low 24 points, the Broncos still emerged victorious, 24–17, having shut out the Chargers until the fourth quarter.

The AFC Championship Game once again pitted Peyton Manning and his Broncos against Tom Brady and the New England Patriots, the 15th matchup between the two veteran quarterbacks. The Broncos won 26–16 on the back of a 400-yard passing performance by Manning, which included two touchdown drives that lasted over seven minutes each, earning the Broncos their first Super Bowl berth since 1998.

Pre-game notes
As the Broncos were the designated home team in the annual rotation between AFC and NFC teams, they elected to wear their home uniform (orange jerseys with white pants) while the Seahawks wore a mixed uniform (white jerseys with navy blue pants, representing away and home, respectively). With the loss, the Broncos fell to 0–4 (outscored 167–38) in Super Bowls in which they wore orange jerseys, while with the Seahawks' win, the team wearing white had then won nine of the previous ten Super Bowls.

Team facilities
The Hyatt Regency in Jersey City served as the home for the Broncos during their stay. The team took up 150 of the 351 rooms until the night of January 29 before taking up the entire hotel. The team hosted the press conferences during the week on a cruise ship docked at the pier of the hotel. Meanwhile, the Seahawks took up 120 to 150 of 429-room Westin Hotel, also in Jersey City. The team retrofitted some rooms into training and massage rooms and occupied the pool. The City of Jersey City renamed its main boulevard, Columbus Drive, to Super Bowl Drive to welcome the teams.

The Broncos utilized the New York Jets headquarters, Atlantic Health Jets Training Center in Florham Park, while the Seahawks utilized the New York Giants headquarters, Quest Diagnostics Training Center adjacent to MetLife Stadium.

Super Bowl week

Since New York and New Jersey co-hosted the Super Bowl, pregame events took place in both states.

The "Super Bowl Kickoff Spectacular" concert was held on January 27 at Liberty State Park in Jersey City, headlined by Daughtry and featuring a fireworks show. Media Day took place on January 28 at the Prudential Center in Newark.

The NFL replaced its indoor NFL Experience fan attraction with an outdoor festival known as Super Bowl Boulevard, which was held along Broadway and Times Square in Manhattan from January 29 to February 1. The event featured various fan-oriented events and attractions, including an artificial toboggan hill. As the area was expected to see around 400,000 people, security was increased in the area. NFL On Location and an NFL Tailgate Party was held at the Meadowlands Sports Complex prior to the game.

Broadcasting

Television

United States
Super Bowl XLVIII was televised by Fox in the United States, with Joe Buck calling play-by-play, Troy Aikman as color analyst, and Pam Oliver and Erin Andrews as sideline reporters. Fox planned to use multiple 4K resolution cameras to provide the ability to zoom closer into certain camera angles, and due to the expected possibility of cold weather, graphics developed by Autodesk would display simulations of wind patterns inside the stadium. Fox constructed an enclosed studio in Times Square for use as part of studio programming on Fox and Fox Sports 1 during the week of the game.

The broadcast attracted 111.5 million viewers, becoming the most-watched event in U.S. television history and surpassing the previous record of 111.3 million viewers who watched Super Bowl XLVI in 2012. Episodes of New Girl and Brooklyn Nine-Nine were the lead-out programs.

For the third consecutive year, a webcast was provided for viewers. Fox streamed its coverage of the game online on PCs and tablets through its new TV Everywhere service Fox Sports Go. Although normally requiring a television subscription to use, Fox made the service available as a free preview for the Super Bowl. Due to contractual restrictions imposed by the NFL's exclusive digital and mobile content deals with Microsoft and Verizon Communications, Fox was unable to offer any additional camera angles or offer streaming on smartphones. Mobile streaming of the game was exclusive to the Verizon Wireless NFL Mobile service.

For the first time in Super Bowl history, a dedicated Spanish language telecast of the game was broadcast in the United States. The broadcast was carried by sister cable network Fox Deportes as part of a larger package of marquee games simulcast by Fox, and featured commentary and surrounding coverage in that language. As with all NFL games, the Spanish play-by-play was also carried via Fox's SAP feed. John Laguna was the play-by-play announcer and Brady Poppinga was the color analyst. With 561,000 viewers, the Fox Deportes broadcast was the highest-rated U.S. Spanish-language cable telecast outside of soccer.

International
NFL Network produced an international television feed of the game, with alternate English-language commentary provided by Bob Papa (play-by-play) and Charles Davis (color analyst).

Advertising
Fox set the sales rate for a 30-second advertisement at US$4 million, matching the price set by CBS for Super Bowl XLVII. Fox began selling advertising for the game in May 2013 and announced it had sold out on December 4.USA Todays Super Bowl Ad Meter named Budweiser's ad "Puppy Love" as the best of the game. Meanwhile, a Coca-Cola spot with people of diverse cultures singing "America the Beautiful" in various languages ignited controversy, with political commentators such as Glenn Beck, Todd Starnes and Allen West condemning the ad for discouraging assimilation, while others considered it a tribute to the idea of the United States as a multicultural society.

Paramount Pictures, Sony Pictures, Lionsgate, Warner Bros., Universal Studios and Walt Disney Studios paid for movie trailers to be aired during the Super Bowl. Following Monsters vs. Aliens' footsteps, Paramount paid for the debut trailers for Transformers: Age of Extinction and Noah, Sony paid for The Amazing Spider-Man 2, RoboCop, The Monuments Men, and Pompeii, Lionsgate paid for Draft Day, Warner Bros. paid for The Lego Movie, Universal paid for Neighbors, and Disney paid for Captain America: The Winter Soldier, Need for Speed, and Muppets Most Wanted.

International broadcasters

Radio

National coverage
The game was nationally broadcast on Westwood One radio, with Kevin Harlan as play-by-play announcer, Boomer Esiason as color analyst, and James Lofton and Mark Malone as sideline reporters. Jim Gray hosted the network's pregame, halftime and post-game coverage. Scott Graham, who hosted additional pregame coverage for Westwood One, also served as MetLife Stadium's public address system announcer for the game.

Local market coverage
The flagship stations of each station in the markets of each team carried their local play-by-play calls. In Seattle, KIRO-FM (97.3) and KIRO (710 AM) carried the "Seahawks Bing Radio Network" call with Steve Raible on play-by-play and Warren Moon with color commentary, while in Denver, the Broncos play-by-play from the "Denver Broncos Radio Network" aired on KOA (850 AM) and KRFX (103.5) with the play-by-play of Dave Logan and the color commentary of Ed McCaffrey. The Spanish-language partner of the Broncos, KJMN (92.1)/KMXA (1090) carried the game in that language for the Denver market. Sirius XM Radio carried the Westwood One and local team feeds over satellite radio, along with the call in eight other languages. Outside of those stations, all the other stations in the Seahawks and Broncos radio networks carried the Westwood One call per NFL rules. KOA and KIRO are both clear-channel stations, which allowed listeners throughout most of the western US to hear the portion of the contest which continued past sunset local time.

International radio coverage
Westwood One's coverage was simulcast on TSN Radio in Canada.

In the United Kingdom, Absolute Radio 90s carried the game for the first time, taking over rights from the BBC, who carried the contest for several years prior. The in-house Absolute Radio broadcast featured Darren Fletcher on color commentary (the same capacity in which he served with the BBC), Rocky Boiman with additional contributions and Will Gavin on play-by-play.

Social media
The social network Twitter estimated that Super Bowl XLVIII generated 24.9 million posts ("tweets") on the service (surpassing last year's total of 24.1), peaking at 381,605 tweets per-minute following Percy Harvin's kickoff return at the start of the second half (surpassing the 231,500 per-minute peak the previous year during the blackout). 57% of the ads broadcast during the game promoted an associated hashtag, up from 50% in 2013.

Entertainment

Pregame
The pregame show began with the Rutgers Scarlet Knights Marching Band and Syracuse University Marching Band. Queen Latifah, joined by the New Jersey Youth Chorus, sang "America the Beautiful".
"The Star-Spangled Banner" was then sung by Renée Fleming, the first, (and, so far, only), opera singer ever to do so at a Super Bowl. A V-shaped formation of three United States Army Black Hawks, three Apache attack helicopters and three Chinook heavy-lifters did a military flyover timed with the last note of the song.

Halftime show

On September 8, 2013, the league announced that Bruno Mars would perform at halftime. On January 10, 2014, it was announced that Red Hot Chili Peppers would be joining Mars as halftime show performers. The show opened with a children's choir singing a chorus from "Billionaire." Afterward, Mars appeared, playing a drum solo. Mars then performed the songs "Locked Out of Heaven", "Treasure", "Runaway Baby", "Give It Away" (with Red Hot Chili Peppers) and "Just the Way You Are" as a tribute to the United States Armed Forces. The halftime performance was the most watched in the history of the Super Bowl drawing in a record 115.3 million viewers, passing the record 114 million who watched Madonna perform two years earlier. It was later revealed that the music was pre-recorded. Red Hot Chili Pepper's drummer, Chad Smith responded on Twitter by saying "FYI... Every band in the last 10 years at the Super Bowl has performed to a previously recorded track. It's the NFL's policy."

Planners initially indicated there would not be a halftime show at all due to the possibility of poor weather conditions. One such logistical problem would be assembling and disassembling the halftime show stage during a blizzard. But the league went ahead after all. According to Mike Florio of Profootballtalk.com, the NFL wanted to avoid a repeat of Super Bowl XXVI when Fox counter-programmed a special live episode of In Living Color''. Fox had not yet become a television partner with the NFL and saw an opportunity to pull young audiences away from a halftime show that lacked big-name performers. As a result of Fox's ratings success, the league tapped Michael Jackson to perform during the following season's Super Bowl XXVII, and since then the league has continued to book big-name talent to hold the television audience.

Touchdown Entertainment, the company that produced the event, incorporated the live audience into the show and transformed the crowd into "the largest ever LED screen". During the show, spectators put on a black knitted hat called a "video ski hat" with 3 embedded LEDs that lit up on command. The hats transformed the audience into an enormous human video screen made up of over 80,000 pixels. Images including the Pepsi logo flashed across the crowd, as well as video of the live Red Hot Chili Peppers performance and fireworks display. Thanks to this technology, each spectator was integrated to the show and the Super Bowl Halftime claimed to feature the largest-ever human video screen. In an original idea by Nuno Lopes, the company that invented and provided the crowd activation technology is the Montreal-based company PixMob.

Game summary

The game kicked off at 6:32 p.m. EST (UTC−05:00).

First half
On Denver's first play after receiving the opening kickoff, center Manny Ramirez snapped the ball while quarterback Peyton Manning was shifting forward (from shotgun formation) in the process of calling an audible, resulting in the ball going past Manning into the end zone. Running back Knowshon Moreno recovered the ball to prevent a Seahawks touchdown, but he was downed for a safety to give the Seahawks a 2–0 lead. Seattle's score just 12 seconds into the game was the quickest to start a game in Super Bowl history, surpassing the kickoff return by Devin Hester to start Super Bowl XLI seven years earlier. Following the free kick, receiver Percy Harvin gained 30 yards on an end around run to set up Stephen Hauschka's 31-yard field goal, making the score 5–0. Denver was forced to a three-and-out on their next drive, and after the Denver punt, Russell Wilson completed a 37-yard pass to Doug Baldwin, leading to another Hauschka field goal, this one from 33 yards, that increased the lead to 8–0. On the third play of Denver's ensuing possession, Manning was intercepted by Kam Chancellor, giving Seattle a first down on the Denver 37.

Aided by a 15-yard run from Harvin on the first play, Seattle quickly got the ball into the red zone. The Broncos defense eventually managed to force an incomplete pass on third down, but defensive back Tony Carter was flagged for pass interference in the end zone, giving Seattle a first down at the one-yard line. One play later, running back Marshawn Lynch crashed into the end zone, hitting the line so effectively that he ended the play on his feet, scoring a 1-yard touchdown run that made the score 15–0 three minutes into the second quarter.

At this point, the Broncos offense finally managed to get moving, picking up a first down for the first time in the game at 10:37 and moving the ball to the Seattle 35-yard line. But on third-and-13, Manning was hit by Seahawks defensive end Cliff Avril as he tried to throw a pass to Moreno, causing a high short floater that was intercepted by linebacker Malcolm Smith and returned 69 yards for a touchdown. After Seattle's kickoff, Denver mounted a drive to the Seahawks' 19-yard line, aided by Demaryius Thomas's 19-yard reception on third-and-5. With just over a minute left in the half, Denver faced fourth-and-2. Rather than kick a field goal, they tried to pick up a first down, but Manning's pass was incomplete and the score remained 22–0 at the end of the half. The 22-point deficit was the largest faced by the Broncos all season. It was also the third-largest halftime deficit in Super Bowl history; the previous two were also against the Broncos – the Redskins led the Broncos 35–10 in Super Bowl XXII and the 49ers led the Broncos 27–3 in Super Bowl XXIV.

Second half
In order to avoid a big kickoff return, Matt Prater kicked the second half kickoff short, hitting the ground at the Seattle 12-yard line. But it did not stop Harvin from picking the ball out of the air and taking off for an 87-yard touchdown return that increased Seattle's lead to 29–0. The touchdown took place 12 seconds into the second half, exactly the same amount of time that the Seahawks took to score the safety in the first half. It was also the first time that consecutive Super Bowls had kickoff returns for touchdowns (Jacoby Jones' return in Super Bowl XLVII being the previous one, which was also the second half opening kickoff). After an exchange of punts, Eric Decker gave Denver good field position with a 9-yard return to the Denver 45. Two plays later, Manning completed a 23-yard pass to Demaryius Thomas, but cornerback Byron Maxwell knocked the ball out of his hands and Malcolm Smith recovered it, returning the ball seven yards. An unnecessary roughness penalty against Denver added 15 more yards onto the end of the play, giving Seattle the ball at the Denver 42-yard line. Two plays later, Russell Wilson hit tight end Luke Willson for a 12-yard completion on third-and-7 and later completed a 19-yard pass to Ricardo Lockette. On the next play, he threw a short pass to Jermaine Kearse, who broke four tackles as he took off for a 23-yard touchdown reception bringing the score to 36–0.

Denver finally managed to respond on their next drive, advancing the ball 80 yards as Manning completed six consecutive passes, including a 22-yard completion to Wes Welker, and finished the drive with a 14-yard touchdown toss to Demaryius Thomas on the last play of the third quarter. Welker then caught another pass for a successful two-point conversion, cutting the score to 36–8.

However, any momentum Denver might have gained was quickly snuffed out as Seattle tight end Zach Miller recovered Prater's onside kick attempt on his own 48-yard line. He also caught a 10-yard reception as the Seahawks subsequently drove 52 yards, featuring a 24-yard reception by Kearse, and scored on a 10-yard touchdown pass from Wilson to Baldwin that increased their lead to 43–8. There were more than 11 minutes left in the game, but this turned out to be the final score, as Denver's last three drives resulted in a turnover on downs, a Manning fumble that was forced and recovered by Seattle defensive end Chris Clemons (the only sack of the game for either team), and time expiring in the game.

Game statistics and notes

Wilson finished the game 18/25 for 206 yards and two touchdowns. Baldwin was his top receiver with five catches for 66 yards and a score, while Kearse added four catches for 65 and a touchdown. In addition to his 87-yard kickoff return touchdown, Harvin was Seattle's leading rusher with 45 yards, even though he only carried the ball twice. Chancellor had nine tackles and an interception. Manning completed 34/49 passes for 280 yards and a touchdown, with two interceptions. His top target was Demaryius Thomas, who caught 13 passes (a Super Bowl record) for 118 yards and a touchdown. Welker added eight receptions for 84 yards. Linebacker Danny Trevathan had 12 tackles. Moreno was Denver's leading rusher, but with just 17 yards. Overall, Denver's record setting offense gained only 306 yards, with just 27 yards on the ground.

Seahawks' linebacker Malcolm Smith received the Super Bowl Most Valuable Player Award. Denver fell to 2–5 in Super Bowls, while five-time league MVP Manning dropped to 11–12 in the playoffs and 1–2 in the Super Bowl. Including Denver's loss, none of the eight highest-scoring teams in league history won a Super Bowl in the same season and all four teams who entered the championship with the league's leading passer lost the game. Manning's 34 completions and Demaryius Thomas' 13 receptions were both Super Bowl records.

With touchdowns scored on offense, defense and special teams, the Seahawks became the first team since the Ravens in Super Bowl XXXV to do so. Teams with an interception return for a touchdown also stayed perfect, improving to 12–0 in Super Bowls. As a result of scoring their safety 12 seconds into the game and subsequently never relinquishing the lead for the rest of the game, the Seahawks set a Super Bowl record for holding a lead continuously for the longest time (59:48). Denver became only the second team in the past 30 years to score fewer than 10 points during the course of the game.

This was the first time that any NFL game ended with a 43–8 final score, a phenomenon known as scorigami. It is one of three Super Bowls, alongside XXI and XXIV, coincidentally involving the Broncos, where such a phenomenon has occurred.

Following on from his two national championships at USC, Seahawks coach Pete Carroll became just the third coach to win both an NCAA Division 1-A/FBS national championship and a Super Bowl after Jimmy Johnson (Miami and Dallas) and Barry Switzer (Oklahoma and Dallas).

Box score

Final statistics
Sources: NFL.com Super Bowl XLVIII, The Football Database Super Bowl XLVIII

Statistical comparison

Individual statistics

1Completions/attempts
2Carries
3Long gain
4Receptions
5Times targeted

Starting lineups

Mass Transit Super Bowl

Organizers dubbed Super Bowl XLVIII the "Mass Transit Super Bowl", emphasizing and encouraging game attendees and other visitors to use public transportation to get to the game and other festivities throughout the region. The host committee in conjunction with other metropolitan transit agencies, such as NJ Transit, the lead agency, and the Port Authority of New York and New Jersey and Metropolitan Transportation Authority developed special services, fares, schedules and maps to promote the use of metro area's trains, subways, light rail and buses during Super Bowl Week. The plan was a failure that lead to universal criticism by fans and writers who attended the game due to poor execution and overcrowding. , the diagram is still updated online.

Security and safety
The Super Bowl was considered a level one national security event. To that end, the New Jersey State Police and the NFL host committee installed a  chain-link perimeter fence around the Meadowlands Sports Complex, which is located at the intersection of a number of highways. Security planners stated that access to the area would be strictly limited and regulated. To that end, parking spaces were greatly reduced, tailgate parties restricted and walking to the venue strictly prohibited. Taxis and limousines were not permitted to drop off passengers. Passengers for trains to the stadium were limited in what they could carry and were screened before boarding.

The area was patrolled on land, by air and by water since it is surrounded by wetlands. More than 3,000 security guards and 700 police officers were on duty on game day. In addition, SWAT teams and snipers were located throughout the stadium. The security effort was overseen by a joint operations center a few miles away from MetLife Stadium, which was staffed by hundreds of people from 35 different agencies ranging from the CIA to the New Jersey Transit Police.

In February 2013, controversy arose as mayors of five local municipalities said they would not provide emergency services, stating they have been poorly compensated for past stadium events. One of the mayors, William J. Roseman of Carlstadt, New Jersey, stated: "The teams don't care about budget caps and what the impacts are on the taxpayers of Carlstadt. I had to cut back my police department budget by a total of a million dollars over the last several years. While we are forced to lay off police officers, the owners of the Jets and Giants are filling their pockets at taxpayers’ expense."

During the postgame news conference with Super Bowl MVP Malcolm Smith, a man jumped onto the podium, grabbed the microphone and said "Investigate 9/11. 9/11 was perpetrated by people within our own government." Smith did not react hastily but was rather confused and continued on with answering questions from the media. The man quickly walked away but security closed in and he was arrested for trespassing.

Officials
Super Bowl XLVIII had seven officials. The numbers in parentheses below indicate their uniform numbers.
 Referee – Terry McAulay (77)
 Umpire – Carl Paganelli (124)
 Head Linesman – Jim Mello (48)
 Line Judge – Tom Symonette (100)
 Field Judge – Scott Steenson (88)
 Side Judge – Dave Wyant (16)
 Back Judge – Steve Freeman (133)
 Replay Official – Earnie Frantz
 Replay Assistant - Brian Matoren
 Alternate Referee - Clete Blakeman (34)
 Alternate Umpire - Paul King (121)
 Alternate Wing - Greg Bradley (98)
 Alternate Deep - James Coleman (95)
 Alternate Back Judge - Terrence Miles (111)

See also

 Broncos–Seahawks rivalry
 List of Super Bowl champions
 Sports in New York City
 Sports in Newark, New Jersey

References

External links

 
 

Super Bowl
2013 National Football League season
2014 in American football
2014 in American television
2014 in sports in New Jersey
American football in New Jersey
Denver Broncos postseason
Seattle Seahawks postseason
Events in East Rutherford, New Jersey
Sports competitions in East Rutherford, New Jersey
February 2014 sports events in the United States
21st century in East Rutherford, New Jersey
Meadowlands Sports Complex